Below are the results of the 2007 Biathlon World Championships 2007 for the men's mass start, which took place on 11 February 2007.

Results

References 

Men's Mass Start